John Stanford may refer to:

People
John Stanford I (1537–1603), MP for Leicester in 1572 and 1593
John Stanford II (died 1603), MP for Leicester in 1597, son of the above
 J. K. Stanford (John Keith Stanford, 1892–1971), British writer
John Frederick Stanford (1815–1880), English barrister, literary scholar, and politician
John Stanford (US politician), see Members of the California State Legislature
John Stanford (space ambience artist), see Mare Tranquillitatis
John Stanford (general) (1938–1998), U.S. Army officer and Seattle school district superintendent
John Stanford (minister) of First Baptist Church in America
John Stanford (baseball), see Charles M. Murphy
John Stanford (teacher), pioneer of deaf education in the U.S., founder of NYSD

Other uses
John Stanford International School, Seattle, Washington, United States